The following is a list of films shown at the Butt-Numb-A-Thon film festival formerly held each December in Austin, Texas, and hosted by Ain't It Cool News founder Harry Knowles.

Feature films are listed in bold.  Trailers are listed in italics.  All other items are annotated as appropriate.

Butt-Numb-A-Thon 1 (1999)
 Plan 9 from Outer Space
 Magnolia
 Song of the South
 Fritz the Cat
 Fade to Black
 Phantom of the Paradise
 Calling All Girls
 Giant Gila Monster
 Pitch Black, followed by special appearance by actor Vin Diesel.
 Vampyres (Daughters of Dracula)
 Tron
 Six String Samurai

Butt-Numb-A-Thon 2 (2000)
 Destination Mars
 The Hobbit
 The Gift
 The Sea Wolf
 Wonder Bar
 Snatch, followed by special appearance by actor Ade.
 Beneath the Valley of the Ultra-Vixens
 Batman Beyond: Return of the Joker
 RoboCop
 Shogun Assassin
 Santa Claus' Story
 Ed Gein, followed by special appearance by actor Steve Railsback.

Butt-Numb-A-Thon 3 (2001)
 Fiend Without a Face
 The Majestic, preceded by pre-taped introduction from Director Frank Darabont.
 Rock All Night
 King Kong
 Vanilla Sky
 Cabin in the Sky
 Stunt Rock - this trailer is a BNAT classic and is always shown, typically early in the evening. 
 Kid 'in Africa (short)
 Blood Feast 2: All U Can Eat, followed by a special appearance by Producer Jacky Lee Morgan.
 Terror of Tiny Town, followed by a special appearance by actor Clarence Swenson.
 The Lord of the Rings: The Fellowship of the Ring, preceded by a wacky pre-taped introduction from Director Peter Jackson and WETA Workshop guru Richard Taylor.

Butt-Numb-A-Thon 4 (2002)
 The Mask of Fu Manchu
 Chicago
 Machine-Gun Kelly
 Odds Against Tomorrow
 Crippled Avengers
 Night Warning, followed by a special appearance by actor Bo Svenson.
 May
 Dust and Blood (short film)
 House of 1000 Corpses
 Tiptoes, a special "Director's Cut" that was introduced as representing the true vision of Director Matthew Bright.
 Raiders of the Lost Ark: The Adaptation (partial screening)
 The Lord of the Rings: The Two Towers

Butt-Numb-A-Thon 5 (2003)
 Haunted Gold
 Adventures of Captain Marvel (partial screening of first episode)
 The Lord of the Rings: The Return of the King followed by Q&A with Director Peter Jackson, Writer Frances Walsh and Writer Philippa Boyens.
 The General with musical accompaniment from Guy Forsyth
 Oldboy
 Sky Captain and the World of Tomorrow
 Nid de guepes
 Blind (short film)
 Ginger Snaps 2: Unleashed
 Haute Tension
 Teenage Mother
 The Rotten Fruit
 Undead
 The Passion of the Christ followed by Q&A with Director Mel Gibson.

Butt-Numb-A-Thon 6 (2004)
Dec. 11-12, 2004
 Putney Swope
 Willie McBean and his Magic Machine
 Lemony Snicket's A Series of Unfortunate Events followed by Q&A with actress Emily Browning and actor Liam Aiken.
 Madagascar (unfinished clips)
 The Black Swan
 The Hitchhiker's Guide to the Galaxy slide show/Q&A with Producer Robbie Stamp.
 Blonde Venus
 Legend of the Sacred Stone
 Miss Sadie Thompson
 War of the Worlds with video introduction from Steven Spielberg and Tom Cruise.
 The Phantom of the Opera
 Welcome Home, Brother Charles
 The Ring 2
 The Mutations and Q&A with Director Robert Weinbach.
 Toys are Not for Children
 Layer Cake and Q&A with actor Tamar Hussain.
 2001 Maniacs (clip) with introduction from Director Eli Roth.
 Casshern
 Ong-Bak
 Time Piece (short)
 The Chronicles of Narnia: The Lion, the Witch and the Wardrobe (behind the scenes clips)
 Kung Fu Hustle

The 7th Voyage of Butt-Numb-A-Thon (2005)
Dec. 10-11, 2005
 Apocalypto
 The Most Dangerous Game
 The Pit and the Pendulum by Ray Harryhausen
 King Kong
 Footlight Parade
 Sick Girl
 Sympathy For Lady Vengeance
 The Professionals
 District B13
 2gether 4ever at Bloody-Disgusting.com, at Ain't It Cool News
 Cigarette Burns
 Hostel (unfinished clip) presented by Eli Roth.
 The Descent
 Stunt Rock
 Drum
 X-Men: The Last Stand
 Mission: Impossible III
 Der Fuehrer's Face
 V for Vendetta

OctoButt-Numb-A-Thon (2006)
Dec. 9-10, 2006
 Pan's Labyrinth - this film was not part of the core BNAT line-up, but it was open to BNAT attendees the night before.
 Chirpy (short)
 Stunt Rock 
 Raw Force
 Teenage Tramp
 The Telephone Book
 Black Snake Moan and Q&A with Director Craig Brewer.
 Dreamgirls and Q&A with Director Bill Condon.
 Panorama Blue 
 Female Animal 
 Baby Love 
 Girls Are For Loving 
 Underage
 Once Upon a Girl
 Inherit the Wind 
 Rocky 
 Rocky II 
 Rocky III
 Rocky IV 
 Rocky V 
 Rocky Balboa with introduction by Sylvester Stallone.
  Fanboys preview.
 The Mafu Cage 
 The Buttercup Chain 
 PEPE 
 Mantango 
 Knocked Up 
 Teen Wolf (snippet) - started as a joke; not shown in full.
 Black Book 
 The Informer 
 The Challenge of the Lady Ninja 
 The Legend of Hillbilly John 
 It Came Without Warning 
 Cannibal Girls 
 Curse 
 Raw Force 
 Smokin' Aces 
 300 and Q&A with Director Zack Snyder.
 Children of Men - this film was not part of the core BNAT line-up, but it was open to BNAT attendees the night after BNAT.

Half-Ass-A-Thon (2007)
June 24–25, 2007
 Africa: Texas Style 
 Drum 
 Three the Hard Way 
 Stunt Rock 
 Wonder Bar 
 Tarzan and the Brown Prince aka Tarzán y el arco iris 
 Gymkata 
 Death Ride aka Crash! 
 The Taking of Pelham One Two Three
 Gambit 
 (PSA) Clint Eastwood describes crack cocaine and warns the audience to avoid it.
 Stardust with introduction by Director Matthew Vaughn.
 Battle Beneath the Earth 
 (advertisement) Starmaster for the Atari 2600
 The Magic Voyage of Sinbad aka Sadko 
 (advertisement) Two Bic(c) lighters talk about refreshments that are available in the lobby.
 Topkapi 
 Future Kill 
 The Toy Box 
 White Comanche aka Comanche Blanco 
 Who? 
 The Terrornauts
 Tarzan and the Jungle Boy
 Impulse 
 Seven Blows of the Dragon aka Shui Hu Zhuan

Big Trouble at Butt-Numb-A-Thon 9 (2007)
Dec. 8-9, 2007; Alamo Drafthouse at The Ritz, Austin, Texas
 Hobo with a Shotgun 
 Popcorn
 Pinocchio's Birthday Party at IMDb
 Happy Birthday to Me at IMDb
 The Party Animal at IMDb
 Stunt Rock
 The Great McGinty at IMDb
 The 'Burbs at IMDb
 Bachelor Party
 Amin: The Rise and Fall
 Charlie Wilson's War*  trailer
 A Bomb for a Dictator at IMDb
 Have Your Kids Immunized Today (Will Rogers Institute PSA)
 Mr. No Legs
 Pickup on South Street at IMDb
 The Secret of Magic Island at IMDb
 Big Trouble in Little China
 Thundercops
 Mongol  trailer
 The Exterminator at IMDb
 Vintage In-Theater Pizza Advert
 Sorceress at IMDb
 The Abominable Dr. Phibes trailer
 Voyage of the Rock Aliens at IMDb
 Get Crazy at IMDb
 Freckles at IMDb
 Sweeney Todd: The Demon Barber of Fleet Street* trailer
 Blind Fury at IMDb
  Stop or My Mom Will Shoot
 Lonely Are the Brave at IMDb
 Man Beast at IMDb
 W.
 Three in the Cellar at IMDb
 The Evictors at IMDb
 The Poughkeepsie Tapes* (director/writer John Erick Dowdle, wife/star Stacy Chbosky, and writer Drew Dowdle attended but were unable to speak as scheduled due to studio demands)
  Teen Lust at IMDb
 "The City on the Edge of Forever" episode of Star Trek, broadcast in HD.
 Call Me Bwana at IMDb
 J.D.'s Revenge at IMDb
 Golden Needles at IMDb
 Black Samurai
 Addio Zio Tom | Farewell Uncle Tom at IMDb
 Halloween III: Season of the Witch at IMDb
 Nightmares
 Trick or Treat at IMDb
 Trick 'r Treat* with Q&A with director/writer Michael Dougherty. trailer

EXCLUSIVE CLIPS
 "Rambo" with on-screen text intro from Sylvester Stallone.
 "WALL-E" with intros and Q&A with producers.
 "The Chronicles of Narnia: Prince Caspian"
 "Fanboys" - Lucas Ranch interrogation filmed four days before BNAT

The Ten Commandments of Butt-Numb-A-Thon (2008)
Dec. 13-14, 2008; Alamo Drafthouse South Lamar Austin, Texas

 Invasion U.S.A
 The Slumber Party Massacre
 Pinocchio's Birthday Party at IMDb
 Stunt Rock
 Teen Wolf first few minutes, ending with film burning. Guest appearance by Teen Wolf in yellow Beavers basketball uniform.
 Viva Villa!
 The Curious Case of Benjamin Button
 Atari 2600 commercial
 Case Study: Amphetamines
 La Joie de Vivre
 Coraline exclusive clips in 3-D
 Dr. Pepper commercial
 The Terrornauts
 Sahara
 Doc Savage: The Man of Bronze 
 MegaForce
 The Villain
 Valkyrie with video intro by Director Bryan Singer.
 Up first 45 minutes, featuring unfinished portions and Q&A with co-directors Pete Docter and Bob Peterson.
 Metropolis with rare 1984 Giorgio Moroder soundtrack featuring popular 80s artists.
 Monsters vs. Aliens in 3D, with exclusive clips featuring unfinished portions and Q&A with filmmaker.
 Dimensionscope 3-D presentation
 Black Angels at IMdB
 Maximum Overdrive
 My Bloody Valentine
 The Devil Within Her at IMdB
 Metal Storm
 My Bloody Valentine in 3D, with introduction and Q&A by director Patrick Lussier and co-stars Jaime King and Megan Boone.
 I Love You, Man with video intro by Paul Rudd and Jason Segel
 Beastmaster 2
 C.H.O.M.P.S. at IMdB
 The Secret of Magic Island
 White Dog
 Push exclusive clips
 Know1ng exclusive clip
 Observe and Report exclusive clips with video intro by Seth Rogen.
 Terminator Salvation exclusive clips with guest appearance by Director McG.
 Watchmen first 22 minutes of film, with guest appearance by actor Jackie Earle Haley.
 Voodoo Woman
 Jim Henson's Time Piece
 Latino Encounter
 Amin
 Frosted Pop-Tarts commercial
 Mission Thunderbolt at IMdB
 Che

BNAT 1138 (2009)
December 12–13, 2009: Alamo Drafthouse South Lamar, Austin, Texas

The name derives from the film THX 1138, as this was the 11th edition of Butt-Numb-A-Thon and the celebration of Knowles' 38th birthday.

 99 & 44/100% Dead at IMDB
 Death Machines
 The Uncanny 
 Stunt Rock
 Teen Wolf - Opening credits and first scene, with the projector burning through the actual film stock per BNAT tradition. This time, Alamo Drafthouse owner Tim League announced that a new remastered digital version had been found, and a man (Scott Weinberg, managing editor of Cinematical) wearing a Dolby T-shirt—who claimed to be from Dolby and called himself Thomas Dolby—promised to write the Drafthouse a check for $15,000 if the film failed to play correctly. Of course, it did not, and the screen quickly filled with static.
 Faust (with live organ accompaniment by Graham Reynolds)
 The Rape Killer at IMDB
 Ricky Schroeder PSA about dealing with abusive situations, dubbed in Spanish
 The Lovely Bones
 That's Dancing
 Nudes on Tiger Reef at IMDB
 The Fastest Guitar Alive
 Girl Crazy
 Attack of the 50-Foot Woman
 Candy Candido - "One Meatball" (music video)
 The Red Shoes
 Beer-chugging contest between teams consisting of a BNAT attendee, Broken Lizard and Tim League, and members of the Ain't It Cool News staff (including Mr. Beaks, Massawyrm, Merrick, Capone and Harry).
 They Call Her One Eye
 Sudden Death
 Shutter Island
 James Tont Operazione U.N.O.
 Maniac Cop 2 
 Doc Savage: The Man of Bronze
 Le Magnifique
 Micmacs à tire-larigot
 The Ski Bum at IMDB
 Hot Dog: The Movie
 Frozen with introduction by Director Adam Green.
 Bug
 Mission Thunderbolt
 Centipede Horror at IMDB
 The Honeymoon Killers at IMDB
 Mr. No Legs at IMDB
 Lunch Wagon
 The Candy Snatchers
 Clip of Asian men dressed as sumo wrestlers being attacked by aroused dogs.
 AICN - True-ish Hollywood Story featuring taped greetings, memories and sarcastic comments for Harry's birthday from Jon Favreau, Danny McBride, Damon Lindelof, Alex Kurtzman, Roberto Orci, J. J. Abrams and Michael Bay. Produced by Paramount Pictures.
 Iron Man 2 (world premiere of trailer with video introduction by director Jon Favreau)
 Fearless Frank at IMDB
 Animal Protector at IMDB
 Captain Invicible
 Kick-Ass followed by Q&A with Director Matthew Vaughn and star Christopher Mintz-Plasse.
 The Adventures of Buckaroo Banzai 
 I Come in Peace
 Dr. Pepper Post-Cola Wars commercial
 Avatar

Butt-Numb-A-Thon: The Dirty Dozenth (2010)
Dec. 11-12, 2010; Alamo Drafthouse South Lamar Austin, Texas

 True Grit
 Le Samouraï
 On The Town
 Cowboys & Aliens (approximately 40 mins) with in-person intros by Director Jon Favreau, and Producers Ron Howard and Bob Orci.
 Rango Eight-minute exclusive clip with video intro by Director Gore Verbinski.
 Santa Fe Trail
 The Fighter
 The Hunchback of Notre Dame
 Chimes at Midnight
 Richard Pryor: Live in Concert
 The Green Hornet
  Hobo With a Shotgun
 Drive Angry with in-person intro by Director Patrick Lussier.
 Tron: Legacy (BNAT attendees were bussed to the Bob Bullock Texas State History Museum IMAX theater to see the film in IMAX 3D)

Butt-Numb-A-Thon: ThirTEEN WOLF, aka BNAT13WOLF (2011)
Dec. 10-11, 2011; Alamo Drafthouse South Lamar Austin, Texas

The name derives from the long-standing tradition of playing the 1985 movie Teen Wolf at BNAT, only to have the film burn or be destroyed before any significant portion is screened. Tim League, founder and CEO of the Alamo Drafthouse told Jeff Mahler (a longtime BNAT attendee whose love for Teen Wolf inspired its unsuccessful inclusion in the festival each year) that the film would be screened at BNAT13WOLF, but that due to scheduling demands the pristine 35mm print film  they had found had to be cut into "literally thousands of pieces" and edited into the program whenever time was available.  Clips that highlighted the entirety of Teen Wolf were then inserted into the sequences of themed trailers that preceded all of the feature films. The actual clips were in extremely small segments of less than two seconds each.  Most often they were only a few frames in length - a hilarious image from the movie popping up and disappearing in a flash.

 Video message from Eric Vespe, Peter Jackson, Orlando Bloom, Ian McKellen and other cast and crew members of The Hobbit: An Unexpected Journey
 Stunt Rock
 Mini Teen Wolf clip
 Teen Wolf Too
 An American Werewolf in London
 Hugo
 Le Voyage dans la lune (aka A Trip to the Moon) (with live organ accompaniment by Graham Reynolds.)
 Mini Teen Wolf clip
 Nightflyers
 The Apple
 Mini Teen Wolf clip
 The War Between the Planets (aka Il pianeta errante)
 Just Imagine
 The Killer Elite
 Mini Teen Wolf clip
 The Spy Who Came in from the Cold
 Mini Teen Wolf clip
 Top Secret
 Tinker Tailor Soldier Spy, preceded by video introduction by Director Tomas Alfredson and star Gary Oldman.
 35 Movies in Two Minutes
 The Cheap Detective
 Less Than Zero
 Mini Teen Wolf clip
 Young Sherlock Holmes
 Sherlock Holmes: A Game of Shadows, preceded by video intro by director Guy Ritchie.
 The TRON Holiday Special
 The Hand
 The Devil's Hand
 Mini Teen Wolf clip
 The Beast with Five Fingers
 The Hobbit: An Unexpected Journey (3 times) [Originally intended to be shown first, delayed due to technical issues]
 The Fabulous World of Jules Verne
 Popeye
 G.I. JOE: Retaliation
 The Adventures of Tintin: The Secret of the Unicorn
 The Devil Inside [Red-band trailer with attendees given shot glasses filled with alcohol and a candy cane]
 Redzilla
 Von Richthofen and Brown
 Spirited Away
 Porco Rosso
 To the Devil a Daughter
 The Dungeon Master
 The Evil Dead
 The Cabin in the Woods
 clips from UHF
 Ghost Rider: Spirit of Vengeance behind-the-scenes clip
 Race with the Devil
 Ghost Rider: Spirit of Vengeance followed by Q&A with co-Director Brian Taylor.
 Wolf
 Mini Teen Wolf clip
 The Company of Wolves
 Mini Teen Wolf clip
 Wolfen
 Butt Drugs
 The Grey, followed by a Q&A with Producer Jules Daly.
  Mission: Impossible – Ghost Protocol (BNAT attendees were bussed to the Bob Bullock Texas State History Museum IMAX theater to see the film in IMAX 70mm)

Butt-Numb-A-Thon 14: The Lucky Number (2012)
Dec. 8-9 2012; Alamo Drafthouse South Lamar Austin, Texas

Ain't It Cool with Harry Knowles sizzle reel
Teen Wolf (except the final scene and credits, as the film melted twice)
Star Trek Into Darkness (theatrical trailer preview)
The Hobbit: An Unexpected Journey in 48 fps RealD 3D, with in-person intro by director/writer/producer Peter Jackson, writer/producer Fran Walsh and writer/co-producer Philippa Boyens, and followed by Q&A with Peter Jackson
G.I. Joe: Retaliation with video intro by Dwayne Johnson, aka "The Rock"
Video clip of Eleanor Powell at 1981 AFI tribute for Fred Astaire
Broadway Melody of 1940
All Hands on Deck
Kingdom in the Clouds
Munchies
The Gang's All Here
The Wishing Machine
Women in Cell Block 7 with Spanish subtitles
Mama followed by Q&A with Producer Guillermo del Toro, Director Andres Muschietti and Writer Barbara Muschietti.
Pacific Rim (trailer premiere), followed by Q&A with Director Guillermo del Toro.
World War Z rough cut opening footage with video intro by Brad Pitt
A Midsummer Night's Sex Comedy
Will Success Spoil Rock Hunter?
What's Up, Doc?
Libeled Lady
Video birthday message to Harry from Simon Pegg and Nick Frost.
Fateful Findings
Evil Dead clip
Judex
Jerrico the Wonder Clown
Carnival of Blood
Nightmare Alley
Tougher Than Leather
Dead Heat
Amazon Women on the Moon
White Heat
The Heat red band trailer and 2 scenes with in-person intro by director Paul Feig, followed by Q&A with Paul Feig.
The Blood of Heroes
They Call Her One Eye
Rollerball
Streets of Fire
The Warriors
Southern Comfort
Stunt Rock
Pain & Gain trailer, with video intro by Director Michael Bay.
Bullet to the Head

Butt-Numb-A-Thon 15 (2013)
Dec. 7-8 2013; Alamo Drafthouse Ritz Austin, Texas

The Wolf of Wall Street (A small live marching band took the front of the stage & confetti was released during the end credits)
Harlequin
The Hobbit: The Desolation of Smaug
The Agony and the Ecstasy (Shown in 70mm format)
Cheatin'
Popeye
The Dragon Lives Again
The Loves of Edgar Allan Poe
Digging Up The Marrow (Director Adam Green showed an unfinished version of his upcoming film.)
The Haunted Palace
The Fruit Is Swelling
The Wind Rises

Butt-Numb-A-Thon: 16 BNAT Candles (2014)
Dec. 13-14 2014; Alamo Drafthouse South Lamar Austin, Texas

Hooper
Kingsman: The Secret Service, delivered by Samuel L. Jackson with a Q&A prior to the start
The King and The Mockingbird
Inherent Vice
The Interview, delivered by Seth Rogen with cool splashy fireworks intro and a Q&A after
1941
Captain Courageous
Million Dollar Mermaid
Santiago Violenta
A Christmas Horror Story
Son of Kong
The Hobbit: The Battle of the Five Armies

Butt-Numb-A-Thon Episode 17: The Ass Awaits! (2015)
Dec. 12-13 2015; Alamo Drafthouse South Lamar Austin, Texas

Held in the Holly Blain Memorial Theater

Gunga Din
Southern Comfort
Syncopation
Eddie the Eagle
The Tale of the Fox
Anomalisa
Phantasm
The Angry Red Planet
Ninja Busters
Logan's Run
The Revenant

Butt-Numb-A-Thon 18 Psycho (2016)
Dec. 10-11 2016; Alamo Drafthouse South Lamar Austin, Texas

Held in the Holly Blain Memorial Theater

Silence
Deluge
Fences
Long Live the King
Kong: Skull Island (2 scenes)
A Cure for Wellness (with introduction by actor Dane DeHaan and Director Gore Verbinski)
Valerian and the City of a Thousand Planets (clips)
Brigadoon
"Pimpernel" Smith
The Adventures of Robin Hood
Zachariah
Logan (first 40 minutes followed by Q&A with Director James Mangold)
Hard Boiled

References

Butt-Numb-A-Thon